Hasanbey can refer to the following villages in Turkey:

 Hasanbey, Gönen
 Hasanbey, Göynücek
 Hasanbey, Horasan

See also
 Hasanbey Zardabi Natural History Museum